The Croatian First Bocce League is the highest level of bocce competition in Croatia. It has been held annually since the nation's independence in 1991 and is organized by the Croatian Bocce Federation.

Champions 
1991 - BK Nada Split
1992 - BK Zrinjevac-Hortikultura Zagreb
1993 - BK Zrinjevac Zagreb
1994 - BK Zrinjevac Zagreb
1995 - BK Zrinjevac Zagreb
1996 - BK Zrinjevac Zagreb
1997 - BK Zrinjevac Zagreb
1998 - BK Zrinjevac Zagreb
1999 - BK Rikard Benčić Rijeka
2000 - BK Istra Poreč
2001 - BK Rikard Benčić Rijeka
2002 - BK Istra Poreč
2003 - BK Istra Poreč
2004 - BK Istra Poreč
2005 - BK Trio Buzet
2006 - BK Zrinjevac Zagreb
2007 - BK Rikard Benčić Rijeka
2008 - BK Trio Buzet
2009 - BK Trio Buzet

External links 
Croatian Bocce Federation

Sports competitions in Croatia
Sports leagues established in 1991
Boccia competitions